is a railway station in the city of Kanuma, Tochigi, Japan, operated by the private railway operator Tobu Railway. The station is numbered "TN-18".

Lines

Station layout
This station consists of one side platform and one island platform, connected to the station building by a footbridge and also an overhead passageway served by elevators.

Platforms

Adjacent stations

History
Shin-Kanuma Station opened on 1 April 1929.

From 17 March 2012, station numbering was introduced on all Tobu lines, with Shin-Kanuma Station becoming "TN-18".

Passenger statistics
In fiscal 2019, the station was used by an average of 3379 passengers daily (boarding passengers only).

Surrounding area
 
 
 
 Kanuma City Hall
 Kanuma Post Office

See also
 List of railway stations in Japan

References

External links

 Shin-Kanuma Station information 

Railway stations in Tochigi Prefecture
Stations of Tobu Railway
Railway stations in Japan opened in 1929
Tobu Nikko Line
Kanuma, Tochigi